Hurrian may refer to:
 Bronze Age: 
 Hurrians, culture of ancient Anatolia/ Northern-Mesopotamia
 The extinct Hurrian language of the Hurrians
 Fiction:
 God in Arcanis role-playing game
 Hurrians, vegetarian primate species in Isaac Asimov story “The Gentle Vultures”